Steve Addabbo is a record producer, songwriter and audio engineer who helped launch the careers of Suzanne Vega and Shawn Colvin. He had a vital hand in Vega's hit single, "Luka" and Colvin's album Steady On.

Career
He has produced and/or engineered for artists including Bobby McFerrin, Bob Dylan, Eric Andersen, Loudon Wainwright III,  Jeff Buckley, Gary Lucas, Lara Bello, Richard Barone, The Bongos, Robby Romero and Red Thunder,  Richard Shindell, Suzanne Vega, Ana Egge and The Stray Birds, Chiara Civello, Jane Olivor, Olivia Newton-John, The Manhattans and Dar Williams.

Addabbo is also an acclaimed mix engineer who has, among other projects, mixed the Bob Dylan box sets Bootleg 10: Another Self Portrait and Bootleg 12: The Cutting Edge for which he received a Grammy Award. More recently he has mixed the Dylan Bootleg 13, Trouble No More and Bootleg 14, More Blood, More Tracks

He owns Shelter Island Sound Studios located in Manhattan, New York.

Addabbo released his first full-length album Out of Nothing in 2016, 14 songs written or co-written by him.

Recent projects include Richard Barone's Sorrows and Promises: Greenwich Village in the 60s and the Robby Romero track "Born on the REZ" recorded with Dennis Banks, Robert Mirabal and Kris Kristoffersen honoring the Standing Rock Movement.

Selected works
 Bob Dylan - The Bootleg Series Vol 14: More Blood, More Tracks (November, 2018)
 Bob Dylan - The Bootleg Series Vol.13: Trouble No More 1979-1981 (November 2017)
 Jeff Buckley - You and I (released March 2016) and In Transition (released April 2019)
 Bob Dylan - The Bootleg Series Vol. 10: Another Self Portrait (1969–1971) (released August 2013)
 Bob Dylan - The Bootleg Series Vol. 12: The Cutting Edge 1965-1966 (released November 2015)
 Bobby McFerrin - Spirityouall     
 Global Noize - A Prayer for the Planet
 Suzanne Vega - "Left of Center"
 Suzanne Vega - Solitude Standing, Suzanne Vega
 Shawn Colvin - Steady On, Live '88, Cover Girl, Acoustic Christmas (Have Yourself a Merry Little Christmas)
 Richard Shindell - Blue Divide, Sparrow's Point
 Olivia Newton-John - Christmas Wish
 Ana Egge - Lazy Days, Bright Shadows
 Eric Andersen - You Can't Relive the Past, Ghosts Upon the Road, Stages: The Lost Album
 Richard Barone - Glow
 Richard Barone - Sorrows & Promises: Greenwich Village in the 1960s (released October 2016)
 Jane Olivor - Love Decides

External links
Vega on writing "Luka"
Gear-Club Podcast

References

Living people
Record producers from New York (state)
American male songwriters
American audio engineers
Musicians from New York City
Musicians from the Bronx
Year of birth missing (living people)